Table tennis events at the 2007 Southeast Asian Games took place in the Klang Plaza from 3 to 10 December 2007. Singapore swept all seven gold medals at stake for the first time in the history of the games.

Participating nations

 
 
 
 
 
 
 
 
 
 

There was no participation from Brunei.

Competition schedule
The following is the competition schedule for the table tennis competitions:

Medalists

Medal tally

References

External links
Southeast Asian Games Official Results

2007
Southeast Asian Games
2007 Southeast Asian Games events
Table tennis competitions in Thailand
2007 in table tennis
Nakhon Ratchasima